Prince Laurent of Belgium (born 19 October 1963) is the second son and youngest child of King Albert II and Queen Paola, and younger brother of King Philippe. Currently, he is 13th in the Belgian line of succession. He had been as high as third in line, but the constitution was amended in 1991 to extend an equal right of succession to women, putting him behind his sister, Princess Astrid, and her descendants.

Early life and education
Born in the  near Laeken, Belgium, he was educated at the Royal Cadet High School and at the Royal Military Academy.

Marriage and children
Prince Laurent and Claire Louise Coombs were married in Brussels on 12 April 2003. Coombs was also given the title of Princess of Belgium upon her marriage. The couple have three children: 
Princess Louise (born 6 February 2004),
Prince Nicolas (born 13 December 2005, twin with Aymeric)
Prince Aymeric (born 13 December 2005, twin with Nicholas).
The brothers are fifteenth and sixteenth line of succession to the throne. The family live in Villa Clementine, in Tervuren.

Prince Laurent is also a godfather to Princess Maria Carolina of Bourbon-Two Sicilies, the daughter of Prince Carlo, Duke of Castro, a current pretender to the former throne of Two Sicilies and his wife, Princess Camilla, Duchess of Castro.

Alleged corruption scandal
In December 2006, Prince Laurent's name surfaced in a corruption scandal in which funds of the Belgian Navy were spent on his residence (Villa Clémentine) in Tervuren. Although the investigating magistrates denied that Laurent was personally implicated, some of the accused have implicated the prince in the press.

On 5 January 2007, it became known that King Albert II had signed a royal decree, making it possible for Laurent to be called up as a witness in the corruption trial which was to start 8 January. One of the defendants immediately used this to subpoena the prince. During the evening of 8 January, Prince Laurent was interrogated by federal police, appearing in court the following day where he testified at the trial that he had no reason to believe the funding of his renovations could be illegal.

Media reports in March 2007 suggested that Laurent was no longer welcome at the Royal Palace, possibly due to his role in the corruption scandal.

In March 2011, the prince visited the former Belgian colony of the Congo without receiving the required permission; the reported purpose of the visit was to promote awareness of deforestation. As a result, on 9 April he accepted conditions laid down by Belgian Prime Minister Yves Leterme regarding his future activities; had he not done so, the matter of his annual appanage would have been in question.

Health
In March 2014, Prince Laurent was hospitalised with pneumonia and depression. He was voluntarily placed in a medically-induced coma on March 25, and was awakened on 27 March. On 4 April, Queen Paola stated in a letter that Laurent's condition was improving, and that she felt he was 'the most vulnerable' of her three children.

Titles, styles and honours

 His Royal Highness Prince Laurent of Belgium (1963–present)

Prince Laurent does not hold a personal title as younger princes were previously accustomed to receive in the past (such as Count of Flanders or Prince of Liège).

Honours

National
 :
 Grand Cordon of the Order of Leopold

Foreign
 :
 Grand Cross 1st Class of the Order of Merit of the Federal Republic of Germany
 :
 Grand Cross of the Order of Merit of the Republic of Hungary
  Sovereign Military Order of Malta:
 Knight Grand Cross of Honour and Devotion of the Sovereign Military Order of Malta
 :
 Knight Grand Cross of the Order of Adolphe of Nassau
 :
 Knight Grand Cross of the Order of the Crown
 :
 Knight Grand Cross of the Order of Merit
 :
 Grand Cross of the Order of Prince Henry
 :
 Knight Grand Cross of the Order of Civil Merit
 :
 Knight Grand Cross of the Royal Order of the Polar Star

Dynastic orders
  Two Sicilian Royal Family:
 Knight Grand Cross of Justice of the Two Sicilian Royal Sacred Military Constantinian Order of Saint George

Military ranks 

Source : www.monarchie.be,  Prince Laurent

Arms

References

External links

 Official biography from the Belgian Royal Family website

|-

1963 births
Living people
Royal Military Academy (Belgium) alumni
Members of the Senate (Belgium)
Belgian people of Italian descent
Belgian people of Swedish descent
Belgian Roman Catholics
Grand Crosses 1st class of the Order of Merit of the Federal Republic of Germany
Recipients of the Order of Merit of the Republic of Hungary
Grand Crosses of the Order of Merit of the Republic of Hungary (military)
Knights of Malta
Recipients of the Order of the Crown (Netherlands)
Grand Crosses of the Order of the Crown (Netherlands)
Recipients of the Order of Prince Henry
Grand Crosses of the Order of Prince Henry
Order of Civil Merit members
Grand Cross of the Order of Civil Merit
Commanders Grand Cross of the Order of the Polar Star
House of Belgium
People from Laeken
Political controversies in Belgium
Princes of Saxe-Coburg and Gotha
Sons of kings